"Semplicemente" (en: Simply) is a pop song by Italian duo Zero Assoluto, released in 2005.  Subsequently, the song was added to the group's second studio album, Appena prima di partire.

"Semplicemente" speaks about a regret for a love that could never be.

The single became a commercial and broadcast success, reaching #3 in Italy.

Music video 
The "Semplicemente" music video was shot in Rome and was directed by the Cosimo Alema. It was produced by society "The Mob". It begins in a gym, and by the middle of the video, a girl (Selenia Orzella) enters the gym and begins to dance in front of the group.

2005 singles
Zero Assoluto songs
2005 songs